Franz railway station is a railway station located in the community of Franz, Unorganized North part Algoma District, northeastern Ontario, Canada. It is a Via Rail flag stop station on the Sudbury – White River train; service by the Algoma Central Railway ended in July 2015.

In Popular Culture

In his autobiography, Stompin’ Tom: Before the Fame (Viking, 1995), Canadian country/folk-singing legend Stompin’ Tom Connors relates the story from the early 1950s of him and a travelling companion, Steve Foote, disembarking from a freight car as the train they were on slowed through Franz.  “When the train slowed down at one point,” Connors writes, “we figured we must be coming into Hearst [their destination].  So we jumped off and decided to walk into town.  But there was no town.  There was only a railroad gang there — mainly Métis or Cree — and only one building where they all ate and slept.” A worker told them they had “made a big mistake” and were “still out in the middle of the bush.” After inquiring after the foreman for work, the latter — who “looked like a big bear” — “started up the tracks with a big shovel in his hand, hollering, ‘get the f—— out of here before I cut your heads off with this spade!’” It took Connors and Foote four and half days of walking the tracks to get to Hearst, a distance Connors estimated at over a hundred miles.

References

External links
Via Rail page for Franz train station

Via Rail stations in Ontario
Railway stations in Algoma District
Algoma Central Railway stations
Canadian Pacific Railway stations in Ontario